William John Fulton (18 June 1909 – 15 November 1988) was an Australian politician. Born in Cairns, Queensland, he was educated at state schools before becoming a business manager. He served in the military 1939–45. He also sat on Cairns City Council, serving as mayor 1952–59. In 1958, he was elected to the Australian House of Representatives as the Labor member for Leichhardt. He held the seat until his retirement in 1975. Fulton died in 1988.

References

Australian Labor Party members of the Parliament of Australia
Members of the Australian House of Representatives for Leichhardt
Members of the Australian House of Representatives
1909 births
1988 deaths
20th-century Australian politicians
Mayors of Cairns